Three ships of the Royal Navy have borne the name HMS Sturgeon, after the Sturgeon, a freshwater fish:

  was an  destroyer of the  subgroup launched in 1894 and sold in 1910.
  was an  destroyer launched in 1917 and sold in 1926.
  was an S-class submarine launched in 1932. She was transferred to the Royal Netherlands Navy between 1943 and 1945, when she was renamed Zeehond.  She was broken up in 1946.

Royal Navy ship names